The San Lucas AVA is an American Viticultural Area located in Monterey County, California.  It is located at the southern end of Salinas Valley, shares an eastern border with the Chalone AVA, and is bordered on the west by the Santa Lucia Range foothills.  The appellation has the largest diurnal temperature variation of any of California's AVAs.  There is a current petition to designate the San Bernabe vineyard, located at the region's northern end, as its own AVA.  The vineyard is currently the world's largest continuous vineyard.

References 

American Viticultural Areas
American Viticultural Areas of California
Salinas Valley
Geography of Monterey County, California
1987 establishments in California